The Caetano City Gold is a series of low-floor, single-decker bus bodywork designs produced by Salvador Caetano since 1997. As of 2022, the City Gold has been launched with diesel, compressed natural gas (CNG), hydrogen fuel cell and full electric powertrains.

Operators

United Kingdom 

The City Gold range was launched in right-hand drive markets for the first time in 2012, with the launch of the CitySmart midibus on MAN 14.240 diesel-powered chassis in the United Kingdom. With the cessation of production of the MCV Evolution and Plaxton Centro and with Alexander Dennis no longer willing to provide the ADL Enviro200 on MAN chassis, the CitySmart was at this time the only bodywork available for the 14.240, which otherwise would have exited the British market at this point. A single demonstration vehicle was completed in April 2012 and registered by MAN Truck & Bus at their Swindon dealership. The only operator to subsequently order CitySmarts was South Wales-based New Adventure Travel, who purchased the demonstration vehicle as well as nineteen additional brand new vehicles between May 2013 and July 2014.

Caetano subsequently launched the compressed natural gas-powered EcoCity on MAN 18.270 chassis in the United Kingdom in November 2012. A total of 44 EcoCity buses were produced for the British market before the model ceased to be available for this market in August 2017. Arriva UK Bus were the largest customer, primarily for their North East and North West subsidiaries. Anglian Bus, owned by the Go-Ahead Group, were the only other operator to purchase EcoCity buses; these vehicles were subsequently transferred to fellow Go-Ahead subsidiary Plymouth Citybus.

After a hiatus of several years, the City Gold range returned to the United Kingdom in 2020 with the launch of the integral, fully electric e.City Gold in right-hand drive markets. As of June 2022, 34 examples have been produced, all of which were delivered to Abellio London in summer 2020 for operation on routes C10 and P5 in  form.

A single hydrogen fuel cell-powered H2.City Gold vehicle on Toyota Sora chassis has been produced for the United Kingdom as a demonstration vehicle, although no orders have yet followed; Abellio London were among operators to trial this vehicle in 2020.

Mainland Europe 
The first vehicles in the City Gold range entered service in Barcelona in 1997; these were constructed on Mercedes-Benz O405N chassis, featuring Mercedes' own front end design. These were followed by examples constructed on MAN NLxx3F chassis, featuring MAN's own front end design. The diesel-powered City Gold on MAN and Mercedes chassis has proven most popular with operators in Barcelona, Lisbon and Porto. In 2010, five -long articulated buses constructed on Volvo B9LA chassis entered service with STCP in Porto.

24 City Golds on diesel-powered Volvo B7RLE chassis entered service with Carris in Lisbon in 2009, followed later that year by a further 20 EcoCity buses on CNG-powered MAN NLxx3F chassis. Further example of the EcoCity, with facelifted bodywork to match the recently launched electric model, entered service in Lisbon and Porto between 2018 and 2021.

The hydrogen-powered H2.City Gold on Toyota Sora chassis has achieved numerous sales, predominantly in Germany as of 2022; examples have entered service in Bielefeld, Cottbus, Düren and Wiesbaden. In Barcelona, eight H2.City Golds entered service with TMB in 2020 followed by a further seven in 2022.

Hong Kong 

In 2009, 30 City Golds were constructed on Scania K230UB diesel chassis and exported to Hong Kong, entering service with Kowloon Motor Bus to complement their existing fleet of Caetano-bodied Scania double-decker buses. These remain the only City Golds to have been constructed on a Scania chassis.

References 

Single-deck buses
Low-floor buses
Vehicles introduced in 1997
Fuel cell buses
Battery electric buses